Gebel is Turkish and German surname.

Notable people
Notable people with this surname include:
 Franz Xaver Gebel (1787–1843), German musician
 Georg Gebel (the younger) (1709–1753), German musician
 Georg Gebel (the elder) (1685–1750), German musician
 Gunther Gebel-Williams (1934–2001), German animal trainer
 Małgorzata Gebel (born 1955), Polish actress
Dante Gebel (born 1968), Argentine lecturer, writer, and youth pastor as well as the pastor of River Church in Anaheim, California